The Central Puebla Nahuatl language is a Nahuan language spoken  by 16,000 people in Mexico with 1,430 monolinguals.<ref name=e25> It is also known as Central Puebla Aztec, Náhuatl del Suroeste de Puebla, and Southwestern Puebla Nahuatl. The language is spoken in the area south of the city of Puebla in the towns of Teopantlán, Tepatlaxco de Hidalgo, La Magdalena Yancuitlalpan, Atoyatempan, Huatlathauca, and Huehuetlán near Molcaxac. It is written in the Latin script and is taught in most grammar schools of the area.

References

Nahuatl, Central Puebla
Nahuatl